Adittia Gigis Hermawan (born 22 May 1999) is an Indonesian professional footballer who plays as a midfielder for Liga 2 club Bekasi City.

Club career

Persita Tangerang
He was signed for Persita Tangerang to play in Liga 2 in the 2018 season.

Career statistics

Club

Notes

Honours

Club
Persita Tangerang
 Liga 2 runner-up: 2019

References

External links
 Adittia Gigis at Soccerway
 Adittia Gigis at Liga Indonesia

1994 births
Living people
Indonesian footballers
Liga 2 (Indonesia) players
Liga 1 (Indonesia) players
Persikad Depok players
Persita Tangerang players
Association football midfielders
People from Bogor
Sportspeople from West Java